Results from the 1968 Buenos Aires Grand Prix held at Buenos Aires on December 1, 1968, in the Autódromo Oscar Alfredo Gálvez. The race was the first race for the XVII Temporada Argentina.

Classification 

Buenos Aires Grand Prix
1968 in motorsport
1968 in Argentine motorsport
December 1968 sports events in South America